Haki Doku (born 18 June 1969) in Krujë is an Albanian para-cyclist.

Doku became the first athlete to represent Albania at the Paralympic Games when he competed in the Men's road race H2 and the Men's road time trial H2 at the 2012 Summer Paralympics.

As he was the only competitor from the European nation he was also the flag bearer at the opening and closing ceremonies.

Beginning  
I have been working at Finsev S.p.a in Via Camperio 9, Milan since 2000. It's not just work, but a great support of mutual trust from the Finsev spa property Severgnini Family. They passed on the teaching to me and made me enter, not only in the work world but also in the sports world. This is thanks to the invisible Mario Achille Severgnini, who showed me the right direction towards freedom, always supporting me silently, by my side and always behind the scenes.
An indescribable value of humanity that has grown in the years to come, always collaborating with great professionals.

Paralympic Games London 2012 
Haki Doku is the first Albanian athlete in the history of the Paralympics. He competed in London on his hand-bike, a special, three-wheeled bike driven by force of arms. The road to get there was an uphill struggle, thanks to all my supporters who have contributed me achieve my Olympic dream.
Three wheels and the force of arms. To fly his hand-bike and run in the London Paralympics. It was the dream of Haki Doku, 43, disabled Albanian citizen. But dreams sometimes do come true. Haki Doku is the first athlete in the Land of the Eagles to compete in the Paralympic Games.

6 Titles Guinness World Records

 The Guinness World Record for the greatest distance travelled by manual wheelchair in 12 hours is 121 km (75.19 miles) and was achieved by Haki Doku with little, Guido Severgnini at the Arena Civica, Milan, Italy, on 16 May 2015.(eventi in expomilano event organized by the Severgnini Family to support the L'abilita Foundation).
 Guinness World record for the most stairs descended in a wheelchair in one hour is 2176, achieved by Haki Doku in Wolfsburg, Germany, on 24 September 2016.
 The most stairs descended in a wheelchair in one hour is 2,404 and was achieved by Haki Doku in Frankfurt, Germany, on 11 June 2017. Haki Doku attempted this record in order to beat his previous record of 2,176 stairs.
 The most stairs descended in a wheelchair in one hour is 2,564 and was achieved by Haki Doku in Frankfurt, Germany, on 10 June 2018. Haki Doku attempted this record in order to beat his previous record of 2,404 stairs.
 The most stairs descended in a wheelchair in one hour is 2,917 and was achieved by Haki Doku in Lotte World Tower, Seoul, South Korea, on 27 March 2019. Haki Doku attempted this record in order to beat his previous record of 2,564 stairs.
 Nuovo Record: The most stairs descended in a wheelchair in 12 hours is 11.500 stairs and was achieved by Haki Doku in Montparnasse  Tower, Paris France on 11 September 2021.

ReWalk (contribution to scientific research)

February 14, 2013: Haki Doku Paraplegic level D6, walk again with ReWalk: Four weeks training with ReWalk with Dr. Franco Molteni, Dr. Maurizio Cazzaniga, Ing. Eleonora Guanziroli at rehabilitation center Villa Beretta, Costamasnaga.

Spiro Tiger (contribution to scientific research)

Research at University Of Verona, Faculty of Motor and Sport Sciences. responsible Luca Ardigò, scientific director,  with Dr.ssa Gabriela Fischer, in collaboration with mvm Italy www.spirotiger.it. dr. Dario Morelli and Eng. Stefano Morelli.

Hand Water Bike (contribution to scientific research)

Our first HandWaterbike, handpedalled by the Olympic parathlete Haki Doku, participated in the Vogalonga The OpenHandWaterbike, our high-performance boat for disabled athletes, is a reality! First proposed by Ruud Schmidt the project was recently revived by Haki Doku, the Albanian parathlete who represented his country in the Paralympics Games of 2012 in London as a cyclist.
The challenge was accepted by the University of Verona, and we supported them with our community's know-how and providing a few key components. In particular our colleague Franco Mazzante provided technical support and the hulls, Rick Willoughby his folding prop, and his usual valuable advice, Andreas 'Scheny' Schonwalder designed a new dedicated prop (not yet tested).
This collective effort gave the university team (Luca Ardigò, scientific director, Massimo Spoladore, technical director, and Michele Della Piazza ) the support necessary to build the first prototype in a pretty short time.

The boat was then shortly tested, presented to the public and press at Canottieri Olona in Milan (Italy) on June 7 and finally successfully took part in the Vogalonga, a famous long distance regatta, in Venice (Italy), on June 8.

We are now are planning a development phase aimed at increasing the performances of the new boat and hopefully transform Haki's dream (and ours as well) into reality, spreading a new sport which could for the first time allow disabled people to enjoy sports and leisure on water.

Personal life

Doku suffered spinal cord injuries in an accident in 1997. Doku resides in Milan, Italy with wife Enora and his two children, Mario and Alissa.

References

Paralympic cyclists of Albania
Cyclists at the 2012 Summer Paralympics
1969 births
Living people
Albanian male cyclists
People from Krujë
Albanian expatriate sportspeople in Italy